Henrik Christiansen may refer to:

Henrik Christiansen (speed skater) (born 1983), Norwegian long track speed skater
Henrik Christiansen (canoeist), Danish sprint canoer 
Henrik Christiansen (swimmer) (born 1996), Norwegian swimmer